Chrétien du Bois (1597-1655) was a French official in the Comté (Count) of Coupigny. (variant names Corstiaen (Christaesne, Christophe. Noel, Noue, Cristoff, Crijin, Cretien, Gristyn, Guislain) Many languages were spoken in the region, Old French (Flemish-French), Dutch, German, and Corsican since Flanders area was part of the Spanish Netherlands. 

He was the father of three Protestant French-speaking immigrants to colonial New York.  One of these, Louis Dubois, was among the founders of New Paltz, New York, in the late 1600s.

Chretien du Bois was the son of Antoine du Bois and Anne Cousin, and was married to Françoise le Poivre.

Chretien du Bois lived in the village of Wicres, outside of Lille. Documents from the Archives Départementales de Lille indicate he was bailli, lieutenant, greffier & receveur of the Comté of Coupigny.  He died sometime after 1641.

Further information of the area and genealogy can be obtained from the town website https://www.annequin.fr/histoire.htm which states (Modern French)

Between 1425 and 1550, we have little information about Annequin and his lords. We can just quote them. 
The son of Philip, John II of the Bos lived 71 years (1425-1496). Then Jean III du Bos succeeded him until 1501. Anne du Bos then benefited from the lordship until his death in 1516. It is then his son Antoine du Bos (said Antoine de Fiennes) who is the owner until 1537. Finally, Charles du Bois became the lord until 1550, and Eustache de Fiennes succeeded him.
If the sources remain meager, they allow however to know a little more about Eustache de Fiennes. This lord of Annequin is also Count of Chaumont, Viscount of Fruges, Baron of Elnes, and Lord of Esquerdes. Converted to Calvinism, he takes part in the troubles that shake the Artois remained Catholic in the last third of the sixteenth century. He is one of the Protestant leaders who support the Prince of Orange against Spain (Catholic) who administers our region by inheritance from Charles V. In 1577, Eustache de Fiennes was even the leader of the Orange party in Saint - Omer, and in 1578 he participated in the Calvinist attempts to seize power in Arras. Unfortunately for him, this project is a failure and leads him, in 1585, before the Council of Disturbances, which condemned him to banishment and confiscation of his property, including the lordship of Annequin. He died in 1596, and his son Guislain sold the lordship ten years later, to Maximilien du Chastel.

in French https://www.annequin.fr/histoire.htm

Entre 1425 et 1550, nous ne disposons que de peu d’information sur Annequin et ses seigneurs. Nous pouvons simplement les citer. 
Le fils de Philippe, Jean II du Bos vécut 71 ans (1425-1496). Puis Jean III du Bos lui a succédé jusqu'en 1501. Anne du Bos a ensuite bénéficié de la seigneurie jusqu'à sa mort en 1516. C’est alors son fils Antoine du Bos (dit Antoine de Fiennes) qui en est le propriétaire jusqu'en 1537. Enfin, Charles du Bois en devient le seigneur jusqu'en 1550, et Eustache de Fiennes lui succède. 
Si les sources restent maigres, elles permettent toutefois d’en savoir un peu plus sur Eustache de Fiennes. Ce seigneur d’Annequin est également comte de Chaumont, vicomte de Fruges, baron d'Elnes, et seigneur d'Esquerdes. Converti au calvinisme, il prend part aux troubles qui secouent l'Artois demeurée catholique dans le dernier tiers du XVI° siècle. Il est l’un des chefs protestants qui soutiennent le prince d'Orange contre l'Espagne (catholique) qui administre notre région par héritage de Charles-Quint. En 1577, Eustache de Fiennes est même le meneur du parti orangiste à Saint - Omer, et en 1578, il participe aux tentatives calvinistes de prise de pouvoir à Arras. Malheureusement pour lui, ce projet est un échec et le conduit, en 1585, devant le Conseil des troubles qui le condamne au bannissement et à la confiscation de ses biens, dont la seigneurie d'Annequin. Il meurt en 1596, et son fils Guislain vend la seigneurie une dizaine d'année plus tard, à Maximilien du Chastel.

Some internet pages claim that Chretien du Bois' wife was named "Cornelia."  This claim was first made by researcher Matthew Hilt Murphy in a 1980 presentation later re-printed in William Heidgerd, "The American Descendants of Chretien Dubois of Wicres, France." Murphy referenced a 1646 item in the church records of Middlebourg, Zeeland referring to "Bois/Cornelia du/vefve de Jen de Chrestien, native de Tournay."  Murphy has been identified as one who apparently was not familiar with French naming patterns, and his work denounced. However, although the French custom of referring to women in documents by their maiden names is correct, naming patterns in the 15th and 16th century traditionally identify a location as the last name, following through with any identifying titles. We can see this naming pattern change in the late 17th century, with immigration patterns as the VOC expanded their trade routes. Murphy identified to a woman who had married (1) Jean du Bois and (2) Chretien DuBois. In fact, the record refers to a woman whose maiden name was "Cornelia du Bois", who was the widow of "Jean de Chrestien." This does not identify Cretien du Bois, as there are many with variants of the last name Chrestien in the Nord archives, and many variations of Cornelia, which is a Dutch variant of Helene or the English variant of Elenore. There is also transcription variations from older records on the name Cretien, with some identifying it as being misinterpreted from Sacré-tien.  

Chretien du Bois is of particular interest to American genealogists, both because of the notability of his descendants and because several different versions of noble ancestry have been claimed for him. Further DNA testing of several descendants including Sarah Du Bois Van Meter have tested positive in the nobility lineage. 

Several prominent Americans figure among Chretien du Bois' descendants, including former governor of Massachusetts William Floyd Weld, actor Marlon Brando, Jr., [wood family settled in Carolina and finally Tennessee agricultural and industrial monopoly] painter Mary Cassatt, journalist Maria Shriver (wife of California governor Arnold Schwarzenegger), Samuel Walton, General George Smith Patton III and film director George Lucas.  W. E. B. Du Bois is also said to be a descendant.

References

External links
 DuBois Family Association
 Historic Huguenot Street

DuBois, Chretien